Avarampalayam is a part of the Coimbatore city. It is located in  close proximity to Peelamedu, Nava India, Ganapathy. It houses the large number of foundries and motor / pump industries. It is one of the head place of small scale industries & medium scale industries in Coimbatore. It played a major role for industrial revolution in Coimbatore.It has many small scale foundries and large number of small-scale industries & also some medium scale industries.

The nearest neighbourhood to Avarampalayam is Gandhipuram. There are many town buses and share-auto services available from Gandhipuram to Avarampalayam.

The centre of Avarampalayam could be called the triangular road that has the bus stop, temple and library on each side, There is a weekly market that happens every Wednesday evening. Once that used to be the day of weekly purchase for all folks living in Avarampalayam and surrounding area. These days it still continues to be very active even after the supermarkets have become fashionable.

Temples 
 Sri Radha-Rukmani-Venugopalaswamy Temple (Perumal Kovil)
 Sri Lingammal Narrappa naidu temple
 Bannari Mariamman Kovil
 Murugan Kovil
 Karuvalur Mariamman Temple
 Rangammal Kovil
 Pattathu Arasi Amman Kovil

Among the temples the most significant or popular one is Bannari Mariamman Temple. The Annual festival called Kundam also known as Poomethi is performed by the Month of march every year. This is the famous festival performed in the city.

Educational Institutions in Avarampalayam 

 S.N.R. Sons College.
 Sri Ramakrishna Matriculation Higher Secondary School
 Sri Ramakrishna College of Pharmacy
 Sri Ramakrishna College of Arts and Science for Women
 Sri Ramakrishna College of Physiotherapy
 Sri Ramakrishna Dental College & Hospital
 Sri Ramakrishna College of Nursing.
 Sri Ramakrishna Institute of Paramedical Sciences
 Sri Ramakrishna Hospital
 Sri Ramakrishna Kalayana Mandapam
 ABC Matriculation School.
 Jay Matriculation School.
 Vivekananda Vidyalaya Matriculation school.
 Kovai Kalaimagal Matriculation Hr. Sec. School.

Neighbourhoods in Coimbatore